Khon Kaen Sports School Stadium is a multi-purpose stadium in Khon Kaen Province , Thailand.  It is currently used mostly for football matches and is the home stadium of Khon Kaen United F.C.  The stadium holds 2,500 people.

Multi-purpose stadiums in Thailand
Buildings and structures in Khon Kaen province
Sport in Khon Kaen province